Leucos basak, the Albanian roach, Dalmatian roach or Croatian roach, is a species of freshwater fish in the family Cyprinidae. It is found in Albania, Bosnia and Herzegovina, Croatia, and Serbia and Montenegro.

Its natural habitats are intermittent rivers and freshwater lakes.

References

Freshwater fish of Europe
Leucos
Fish described in 1843
Endemic fish of the Neretva basin